The Daytime Emmy Award for Outstanding Morning Program had been awarded every year between 2007 and 2021. Beginning in 2020, the category name was changed from Outstanding Morning Program to Outstanding Morning Show.  In December 2021, it was announced that this Daytime Emmy category will be retired and all morning shows will now be honored at the separate News & Documentary Emmy Awards.

Winners and nominees

2000s

2010s

2020s

2020 (47th)
The Today Show (NBC)
CBS Sunday Morning (CBS)
CBS This Morning (CBS)
Good Morning America (ABC)
Sunday TODAY with Willie Geist (NBC)

2021 (48th)
CBS Sunday Morning (CBS)
Good Morning America (ABC)
Sunday TODAY with Willie Geist (NBC)
The Today Show (NBC)

Multiple wins
6 wins
Good Morning America

5 wins
CBS Sunday Morning
The Today Show

Multiple nominations
15 nominations
Good Morning America
The Today Show

9 nominations
CBS Sunday Morning

6 nominations
CBS This Morning

2 nominations
American Morning
Sunday TODAY with Willie Geist

References

Retired Daytime Emmy Awards
Awards established in 2007
Awards disestablished in 2021